Kountry Luv is a Pakistani television series, directed by Nini. It features Gohar Mumtaz, Urwa Hocane, Mawra Hocane in lead roles. Kountry Luv depicts the love story of two British-Paistanis, Shawn (Gohar Mumtaz) and Zack (Abdullah Farhat) as they explore the different aspects of the country.

The serial marks debut of music band Jal's artist, Gohar Mumtaz on television. Faizan Khawaja, son of producer of "Kountry Luv" also makes his debut through this serial.

Plot
Shawn and Zac, two British-Pakistani friends comes to Pakistan. They stayed with Musharraf's family in the country and along with his family explored the country and their culture, traditions. Along the way Shawn started having feelings for Zuni, the elder daughter of Musharraf.

Cast
Gohar Mumtaz as Shawn
Salman Shahid as Musharraf
Saba Faisal as Muneeza aka Munni Aapa
Abdullah Farhat as Zack
Urwa Hocane as Zuni
Mawra Hocane as Samia aka Sam
Tehseen Chishti as Arshad
Zia Khan as Ameer Ali
Faizan Khawaja as Shahid
Hareeb Farooq as Junaid
Hina Rizvi as Naheed
Azra Aftab as Chaudrani
Imran Ahmed as Haji Sahab
Beena Chaudhary as Kishwar
Rasheed Naz as Jafar
Syed Mohsin Gillani as Mubarak

References

External links
  Kountry Luv- Facebook

2011 Pakistani television series debuts
2011 Pakistani television series endings
Pakistani drama television series
Urdu-language television shows